Hans Schaller is a West German luger who competed in the 1950s. He won the gold medal in the men's singles event at the 1957 FIL World Luge Championships in Davos, Switzerland.

References

German male lugers
Possibly living people
Year of birth missing
20th-century German people